Yehliu most often refers to:

Place 
 Yehliu, a cape in Wanli District, New Taipei, Taiwan

Surname 
 Yehliu (surname), one of the compound surnames of Hakka people in Taiwan

Yehliu may also refer to:

Person
 Regina Ip, a political figure of Hong Kong